Roseane Aparecida de Oliveira Souza (born 23 July 1985), known as just Roseane, also Zizi, is a Brazilian footballer who plays as a defender for the Brazil women's national football team. She was part of the team at the 2011 FIFA Women's World Cup. On club level she played for various clubs in Brasil, including Bangu, also for Zorkiy in Russia and Makkabi Kiryat-Gat in Israel.

References

External links
 
 Soccerway profile

1985 births
Living people
Brazilian women's footballers
Brazil women's international footballers
Brazilian expatriate women's footballers
Brazilian expatriate sportspeople in Russia
Expatriate women's footballers in Russia
Place of birth missing (living people)
2011 FIFA Women's World Cup players
Women's association football defenders
FC Zorky Krasnogorsk (women) players